Yevgeny Astanin (born November 11, 1974) is an Uzbek sprint canoer who competed in the mid-1990s. At the 1996 Summer Olympics in Atlanta, he was eliminated in the semifinals of both the C-1 500 m and the C-1 1000 m events.

External links
Sports-Reference.com profile

1974 births
Canoeists at the 1996 Summer Olympics
Living people
Olympic canoeists of Uzbekistan
Uzbekistani male canoeists
Asian Games medalists in canoeing
Canoeists at the 1994 Asian Games
Medalists at the 1994 Asian Games
Asian Games gold medalists for Uzbekistan
Asian Games bronze medalists for Uzbekistan
20th-century Uzbekistani people